Gamma-glutamyltransferase 6 is a protein that in humans is encoded by the GGT6 gene.

Function

GGT6 belongs to the gamma-glutamyltransferase (GGT; EC 2.3.2.2) gene family. GGT is a membrane-bound extracellular enzyme that cleaves gamma-glutamyl peptide bonds in glutathione and other peptides and transfers the gamma-glutamyl moiety to acceptors. GGT is also key to glutathione homeostasis because it provides substrates for glutathione synthesis (Heisterkamp et al., 2008 [PubMed 18357469]).

References

Further reading 

Human proteins